Vice Versa (1947–1948), subtitled "America's Gayest Magazine",  is the earliest known U.S. periodical published especially for lesbians. Its mission was to express lesbian emotion within the bounds of good taste.

History
Vice Versa was the project of Lisa Ben (an anagram of "lesbian"), real name: Edythe Eyde, a secretary at RKO Studios in Los Angeles. By her own account, she had "a lot of time to herself" at work and, starting in June 1947, "twice each month typed out five carbons and one original of Vice Versa (a technique she had picked up as a member of science fiction fandom). She recalled being told by her boss that he didn't care what she was typing, but he wanted her to "look busy" so people at the studio would think he was important. 
She described the intention of the magazine being to create "a medium through which we may express our thoughts, our emotions, our opinions- as long as material was 'within the bounds of good taste'".

The nine issues of Vice Versa created by Lisa Ben "combined a unique editorial mix and a highly personal style" and opened up a forum for lesbians to communicate with each other via readers' letters, personal essays, short fiction and poetry. The first issue was 15 pages long; subsequent issues ranged from 9 to 20 pages.

In Unspeakable, his history of the gay and lesbian press in the United States, journalist and historian Rodger Streitmatter noted that Vice Versa "contained no bylines, no photographs, no advertisements, no masthead and neither the name or address of its editor... yet it set the agenda that has defined lesbian and gay journalism for 50 years." As examples of the 'defining qualities' of the magazine, Jim Kepner, founder and curator of the International Gay and Lesbian Archives cites Vice Versa's mix of editorials, short stories, poetry, book and film reviews and a letters column as setting "the pattern that hundreds [of gay and lesbian magazines] have followed".

The publication was free and Ben initially mailed three copies to friends and distributed the rest by hand, encouraging her readers to pass their copies along to friends rather than throwing them away. Ben believed several dozen people read each copy. Although scrupulous about avoiding material that could be considered "dirty" or risqué, she stopped mailing copies after a friend advised her that she could be arrested for sending "obscene" material through the mail. Publications addressing homosexuality were automatically deemed "obscene" under the Comstock Act until 1958. 
Ben eventually left her job at RKO and publication of the magazine ceased in 1948.

The editor expressed the hope that "perhaps Vice Versa might be the forerunner of better magazines dedicated to the third sex, which, in some future time, might take their rightful place on the newsstands beside other publications, to be available openly and without restriction."

See also
 Die BIF – Blätter Idealer Frauenfreundschaften - worlds' first "all-lesbian" periodical, 1926
 Die Freundin - worlds' first lesbian periodical, though published and partially edited and written by men, 1924
Lesbian literature
List of lesbian periodicals
 Society for Human Rights, publisher of Friendship and Freedom, the earliest known gay publication in the United States (although no copies are known to survive)

Notes

References
 Brandt, Kate (1993). Happy Endings: Lesbian Writers Talk About Their Lives and Work. Naiad Press. .
 Katz, Jonathan Ned (1983). Gay/Lesbian Almanac, Harper & Row. .
 Murdoch, Joyce and Deb Price (2001). Courting Justice: Gay Men and Lesbians v. the Supreme Court. New York, Basic Books, 
 Potter, Claire (1986). Lesbian Periodical Index. Naiad Press. .
 Streitmatter, Rodger (1995). Unspeakable: The Rise of the Gay and Lesbian Press in America. Faber & Faber.
 Steitmatter, Rodger (1998). "Vice Versa: America's First Lesbian Magazine," American Periodicals, vol. 8 (1998), pp. 78-95. In JSTOR

External links
 Vice Versa by Lisa Ben at JD Doyle's Queer Music Heritage website, which includes every issue of the historic publication online (June 1947 - Feb. 1948)

 
1940s in LGBT history
1947 establishments in California
1948 disestablishments in California
LGBT-related magazines published in the United States
Monthly magazines published in the United States
Defunct women's magazines published in the United States
Lesbian culture in California
Lesbian-related magazines
Lesbian history in the United States
Magazines established in 1947
Magazines disestablished in 1948
Magazines published in Los Angeles